Lucia Domazet (born 17 June 2003) is a Croatian footballer who plays as a defender for Women's First League club ŽNK Split and the Croatia women's national team.

Club career
Domazet has played for Split in Croatia at the UEFA Women's Champions League.

International career
Domazet made her senior debut for Croatia on 27 November 2020 during the UEFA Women's Euro 2022 qualifying.

References

2003 births
Living people
Croatian women's footballers
Women's association football defenders
ŽNK Split players
Croatia women's international footballers